Imer may refer to:

People
 Adam Imer (born 1989) is a Brazilian field hockey player
 Teresa Imer, also known as Teresa Cornelys (1723–1797), Italian operatic soprano
 Édouard-Auguste Imer (1820–1881), French painter

Places
 Imer, Trentino, Italy

Other
 Instituto Mexicano de la Radio
 International Medical Evaluation and Referral
 Institute for Mineral & Energy Resources